Cora Taylor (born January 14, 1936) is a Canadian writer. Born in Fort Qu'Appelle, Saskatchewan, she moved to Edmonton in 1955. Her career as a writer began as editor of the Alberta Poetry Yearbook from 1980 to 1985. She wrote many articles and short stories for publication in various Canadian periodicals. Cora's first major success came with the publication of her first novel Julie by Coteau Books. Her second published novel was The Doll, which featured artwork on its cover painted by her daughter Wendy Mogg. Following that came Summer of the Mad Monk, a story set in 1932 during the Dust Bowl. Her fourth and most popular novel to date is On the Wings of a Dragon. A sequel was released but did not gain as much popularity as the first. Following that was Out on the Prairie, The Deadly Dance, and then the Ghost Voyages series. The latest Ghost Voyages Book (Part IV) was released on May 3, 2008. The main character in the Ghost Voyages series has the same name of Taylor's first grandson, Jeremy Belly. Aunt Wendy is based on her daughter, Wendy Mogg. Other books written include the Angelique series.

Novels
 Julie (1985)
 The Doll (1987)
 Ghost Voyages (1992 -2008)
 Summer of the Mad Monk (1994)
 Vanishing Act (1997)
 On Wings of a Dragon (2001)
 Angelique series (2002, 2005)
 On Wings of Evil (2005)
Many Places (2007)
Chaos in China (2009)
Finding Melissa (2014)

References

External links
 
 

1936 births
Living people
Canadian children's writers
Writers from Edmonton
Writers from Saskatchewan
People from Fort Qu'Appelle
Canadian women children's writers
Canadian women novelists